Ali Dan Tsamiya known as Yaji I or Ali Yaji Dan Tsamiya was a king and later the first Sultan of Kano, a state in what is now Northern Nigeria. Yaji I ruled from 1359 to 1385 CE. A prominent figure in the state's history, Yaji used a religious revolution to finally solidify his family's grasp on Kano and its sub-kingdoms after centuries of strife. He was also responsible for the absorption of Rano into Kano. 

Since the arrival of the first king of Kano, Bagauda in 999, there had been tension between the newly established aristocracy and the indigenous pagans of Kano. All subsequent Kano Kings engaged in feuds with the pagan population but were unable to gain mastery over them. In 1350, Yaji aided by Soninke Wangara scholars from Mali, relinquished the Hausa Animist Cult of Tsumbubura, and proclaimed Kano a Sultanate.

He violently crushed a subsequent rebellion by the animist cult at the Battle of Santolo, waging in the processes the first Islamic Jihad in Sudanic Africa. He conquered the Kwararafa and the numerous Hausa kingdoms around Kano laying the seeds for Kanoan dominance in the Bilad as-Sudan. He died in 1385 having laid the seeds for an eventual Kanoan Empire.

Early life 
Ali Yaji was born to the unfortunate 9th King of Kano, Tsamiya and his consort Maganarku. His bad temper as a child earned him the epithet "Yaji", which is known today as a Hausa spice mix.

King of Kano 
He became the 11th king of Kano in 1343, succeeding his uncle, Usman Zamnagawa who deposed and murdered his father. Yaji immediately engaged in multiple conquests in Zamna Gaba, Rano and Bunu, reigning at Bunu for two years before proceeding to Kur where he decided to remain. The Chronicle mentions that Yaji expelled the King of Rano from Zamna Gaba, presumably signaling Kano's suzerainty of the Hausa State of Rano.

Establishing Islam in Kano 
Though there were elements of the islamic religion in kano, It was during Yaji's reign that Islam became the prominent faith in the kingdom. According to the Kano Chronicles, about forty Soninke Wangara scholars from Mali, led by Abdulrahman Zaite fully converted the King to the Islamic faith after which Yaji proclaimed himself a Sultan. The chronicles listed names of some of the other scholars as Yakubu, Mandawali, Famori, Bilkasirn, Kanaji, Dukere, Sheshe, Kebe, Murtuku, Liman Jibjin Yallabu, the father of Sarkin Pawa, Gurdumlius, Auta, Laual, Liman Madata.

Yaji made Zaite Alkali (Qadi), Laual Muezzin, and Gurdamus his Liman (Imam). Auta was also charged with ensuring all animals were slaughtered according to Dhabihah. Yaji then commanded his subjects in all the towns of Kano to observe the five daily salahs to which they obliged. He also built a mosque facing the Kaaba underneath the Kano Sacred Tree.

The Sarkin Gazarzawa was however against these new practices and would desecrate their mosque after every prayer. Because of this, a man called Danbugi was put in charge of a militia to guard the mosque. The pagans however would not relent and tried to entice Danbugi and his men away and were able to succeed in luring some of them. Sheshe and Famori decided that the only way to stop the desecration was through prayer and gathered the Muslims for that purpose. According to the Kano Chronicle, the leader of the pagans was struck blind shortly afterwards and soon after all his acolytes involved in befouling the mosque. Yaji was then said to have taunted the leader of the pagans , " Be thou Sarki among the blind".

Battle of Santolo and Further Conquests 

"Yaji, conqueror of the rocky heights, scatterer of hosts, lord of the town" 

Yaji, encouraged by his ordeal with the rebellious pagans decided to further spread the religion. For this reason he set his sights on conquering Santolo, the stronghold of the pagans in Kano because he believed every other town will follow him if he was able to succeed. His Wangara counselors advised him that they should pray beside the Moat of Santolo before they wage war. Yaji and his army camped at a place in Santolo called Duji, after which they proceeded to march around Santolo praying until daybreak when a battle ensued. Yaji scored a crucial victory against the pagans in the Battle of Santolo, which would see him hold further successful conquest south of Kano. This culminated in a confrontation with the Kwararafa, where its inhabitants were said to have deserted their land in fear, taking refuge on a hill in Tagara. The Sultan tried to wait them out to force a battle but they instead sent him a hundred slaves to appease him. There are conflicting reports as to whether he died in Kwararafa or after he returned to Kano. He ruled Kano for thirty seven years after which he was succeeded by his brother, Muhammad Bugaya.

Personal life 
Yaji had a son Kanajeji with Aunaka. Kanajeji became the 13th ruler of Kano. Yaji shared the same father and mother with Sarki Muhammad Bugaya which was unusual or Kanoan rulers in that era due to excess polygamy.

Legacy 
Yaji I is considered to be one of the greatest rulers and warriors in Kano's history. He is remembered as the first Sultan of Kano and for waging the first Oslamic jihad in region. Yaji's actions were pivotal as they cleared the path for Kano's eventual supremacy among the Hausa states and in Sudanic Africa.

Biography in the Kano Chronicle
Below is a full biography of Yaji I from Palmer's 1908 English translation of the Kano Chronicle.

References

14th-century monarchs in Africa
Emirs of Kano